Guyanese Antiguans and Guyanese Barbudans are Guyanese people born in or citizens of Guyana.

Statistics

Census Data (2011) 

 3,669 Guyanese Antiguans and Barbudans are Guyanese citizens

 3,267 Guyanese Antiguans and Barbudans use the internet, while 2,687 do not,  84 answered "don't know/not stated".
 2,679 Guyanese Antiguans and Barbudans own 0 motor vehicles, 2,259 own one, 622 own two, 123 own three, and 54 own four or more.
 3,460 Guyanese Antiguans and Barbudans are covered by insurance.

References